"Cryocola antiquus" is a species of bacteria from the family of Microbacteriaceae. "Cryocola antiquus" has been isolated from subarctic tundra soil.

References

Microbacteriaceae
Bacteria described in 2003
Monotypic bacteria genera